Abraham of Paleostrov ( - Avraamy Paleostrovsky; died c. 1460), Avraamy Olonetsky is a saint in the Russian Orthodox Church, a hegumen of Nativity of the Blessed Virgin Mary monastery in Paleostrov. Abraham was a disciple of Cornelius of Paleostrov and one of his successors as abbot of his monastery.

Life and ministration
From the Legend of the Life of the Reverend Cornelius of Paleostrov, it is known that Abraham came to Cornelius after he had settled in a cave on the island of Paley on Lake Onega. The Paleostrovsky Monastery was founded by Cornelius, presumably no later than 1415-1421. Abraham together with other disciples of Cornelius participated in the construction of the churches of the Nativity of the Blessed Virgin, of Elijah the Prophet and Nikolaos the Wonderworker, the caves for the monks. In the lifetime of Cornelius he appointed Abraham as his successor. The Reverend Cornelius died about 1420, Abraham buried him in the cave of the island of Paley. Later, the relics of Cornelius Paleostrovsky were transferred to the Church of Nativity of the Blessed Virgin. The Monk Abraham died in the middle of the 15th century. He was buried in the Church of the Nativity of the Virgin near Cornelius.

Veneration
The date of the local canonization of Abraham Paleostrovsky is unknown. In the XVII century, the Palaeostrovsky Monastery was twice devastated, as a result of which most of the archive was lost. The local veneration of Abraham and Cornelius was documented at the beginning of the 19th century. Archbishop Sergius (Spassky) assigned the feast day of both saints - August 21. In 1974, Abraham Paleostrovsky was included in the Synaxis of the 
Karelian Saints, and in 1981 - in the Synaxis of the Novgorod Saints.

His feast day is celebrated on August 21 in the Russian church.

References

External sources
 Корецкий В. И. Новгородские грамоты XV в. из архива Палеостровского монастыря (Novgorod letters of the XV century from the archive of the Paleostrovsky Monastery) // АЕ за 1957 г. Moscow, 1958. pp. 437–451.

Year of birth missing
1460 deaths
15th-century Christian saints
Russian abbots
Russian saints